"In the Morning" is a song by Australian band, Boom Crash Opera. The song was released in March 1993 as the second single from their third studio album, Fabulous Beast (1993).

Track listing
 "In the Morning" - 4:01
 "The Big End of Little Town" - 4:13
 "Dreaming Away" - 2:21

Charts

References

External links 
Boom Crash Opera website

1992 songs
1993 singles
Boom Crash Opera songs
East West Records singles